Shirin Su Rural District is a rural district (dehestan) in Maneh District, Maneh and Samalqan County, North Khorasan Province, Iran. At the 2006 census, its population was 7,761, in 1,635 families.  The rural district has 28 villages.

References 

Rural Districts of North Khorasan Province
Maneh and Samalqan County